Area code 585 is the area code for Rochester and eight surrounding counties in Western New York. It was created on November 15, 2001 in a split from area code 716. Previously, Rochester had shared 716 with Buffalo. Aside from new area codes created in the New York City metropolitan area and Long Island, 585 was the second new area code in New York since 1954, having been preceded by 845 in 2000.

The border between 716 and 585 roughly matches county lines (without regard to mailing address) which causes confusion where a ZIP code overlaps a municipal boundary. Therefore, some ZIP codes have phone numbers in two area codes. Among these places: Akron, Alden, Arcade and Cuba. A significant part of Ontario County uses 315/680. Part of the town of Farmington is north of the NY Thruway (Interstate 90), and is "joined" with Wayne County in the 315/680 area code.

, the area code is not expected to require relief until around 2026.

Counties served
 Genesee
 Livingston
 Monroe
 Ontario
 Orleans
 Wyoming
 Allegany
 Wayne (Limited to very small areas of Macedon, Walworth, Ontario).
 Steuben (extreme northwest part of the county, Cohocton and Wayland as well as the respective towns surrounding these villages)

Major communities served by this area code
 Albion
 Batavia
 Canandaigua
 Geneseo
 Medina
 Rochester

See also
 List of New York area codes
 List of NANP area codes
 North American Numbering Plan

References

External links

 List of exchanges from AreaCodeDownload.com, 585 Area Code

585
585
Telecommunications-related introductions in 2001